Number One Hits is the fourth compilation album by American country music artist Tim McGraw. It was released in the United States on November 30, 2010, by Curb Records. The album's new song, "Felt Good on My Lips", was released as the album's lead single, and has since become another number one hit. According to the chart dated November 30, 2011, the album has sold 484,000 copies in the US.

As a bonus track, this album also includes the dance mix of McGraw's first top 10 hit "Indian Outlaw".

Track listing

Charts

Weekly charts

Year-end charts

Certifications

References

2010 albums
Curb Records compilation albums
Tim McGraw albums
Compilation albums of number-one songs